Man Bites Dog is a British public relations company, with its main office located in Brighton, England.

History
The company was founded in 2004 by Claire Mason.

Awards

National awards:

Chartered Institute of Public Relations Award for Outstanding Public Relations Consultancy, 2008 and 2015.
PR Week's Best Place to Work, 2009-14.

References

External links
 Man Bites Dog official website

British companies established in 2004
Business services companies of the United Kingdom
Companies based in Brighton and Hove
Mass media companies of the United Kingdom
Public relations companies of the United Kingdom